Arcadium was a British psychedelic group who released one album in 1969. The band was led by Miguel Sergides who was joined by John Albert Parker, Graham Best, Allen Ellwood and Robert Ellwood.

The band began playing in small clubs before being signed by the fledgling Middle Earth label. The company released a total of five albums before closing shop, and the poor sound quality of their production can be heard in the original pressings of Arcadium's lone LP, Breathe Awhile. The band broke up after the commercial failure of the album and while it remained an obscure record it was reissued on CD in 2003 by Akarma with two bonus songs.

Breathe Awhile (1969)

Track listing

2003 CD Bonus Tracks

Personnel 
Miguel Sergides - Lead vocals, Twelve-string guitar
John Albert Parker - Drums
Graham Best - Bass, Vocals
Allan Ellwood - Organ, Vocals
Robert Ellwood - Lead guitar, Vocals

References

General references
[ Arcadium] at AllMusic

Specific

British psychedelic rock music groups
1969 in British music
Musical groups established in 1969